Kharghuli is a locality in northern part of Guwahati, Assam, India. Situated on the south bank of the Brahmaputra river, it is a residential area. Some parts of this locality has hilly terrain.

Transport
It is connected to rest of city with city buses and other modes of transportation.

See also
 Jalukbari
 Pan Bazaar

References

Neighbourhoods in Guwahati